Maw and Paw are Walter Lantz characters, who made their first appearance in the cartoon "Maw and Paw", in 1953. Their final appearance was in 1968, in "Feudin Fightin-N-Fussin". They are based on the Universal's popular live-action Ma and Pa Kettle film series.

Overview
Maw and Paw are a couple who live with their children and dog in a rural part of the US. Their pet pig Milford appears to be the most educated and therefore the brightest in the family.

A well-known running gag in the cartoons involves Paw stepping on a loose lumber of their house, causing his nose to get stuck in the hole of that wood as it flips. His eldest son would try to help him by punching his nose.

Paw is naïve and occasionally absent-minded. This naïveté sometimes results in him getting knocked out by his wife.

List of cartoons
List of appearances:
"Maw And Paw" (08/10/1953)
"Plywood Panic" (09/28/1953)
"Pig In A Pickle" (08/30/1955) - later reissued by Castle Films as "The Piggy That Stayed Home"
"Paw's Night Out" (08-29-1955) - This cartoon appeared in the music video for Bamboo's Bamboogie.  Later reissued by Castle Films as "Piggy's Dizzy Nite"
"Feudin Fightin-N-Fussin" with Woody Woodpecker (1968)

Other characters

See also
List of Walter Lantz cartoons
List of Walter Lantz cartoon characters

References

External links 
 
 The Walter Lantz-o-Pedia

Film characters introduced in 1953
Universal Pictures cartoons and characters
Walter Lantz Productions shorts
Animated duos
Ma and Pa Kettle
Walter Lantz Productions cartoons and characters